The Radio, Television, Theatre and Arts Workers' Union of Nigeria (RATTAWU) is a trade union representing workers in the arts and media industries in Nigeria.

The union was founded in 1977, as the Radio, Television and Theatre Workers' Union, when the Nigerian government merged twelve unions:

 Association of Radio TV Journalists of Nigeria
 East-Central State Broadcasting Service Programme Staff Union
 ECS Broadcasting Service Clerical and Allied Workers' Union
 ECS Broadcasting Service Engineering Staff Union
 NBC Accounts and Audit Staff Association
 NBC Clerical and Allied Workers' Union
 NBC Engineering Workers' Association
 NBC Studio Managers' Association
 Nigerian Actors' and Allied Professional Union
 Rediffusion (Africa) Ltd African Workers
 Secretariat Staff Association of Nigeria
 Western Staff Radiovision Workers' Union

In 1978, the union was a founding affiliate of the Nigeria Labour Congress.  By 1988, the union had 80,000 members, but by 2005, it had shrunk to only 7,000 members.

References

Entertainment industry unions
Trade unions established in 1977
Trade unions in Nigeria